The Monument to Felix Dzerzhinsky, also known by the nickname Iron Felix, commemorates Felix Dzerzhinsky, Bolshevik revolutionary and head of the first two Soviet state-security organizations, the Cheka and the OGPU.

History

Construction and unveiling 
In 1918, the All-Russian Extraordinary Commission was located in the buildings on Lubyanska Square, the founder and first head of which was Felix Dzerzhinsky, who later headed other state security agencies that were located there. In the autumn of 1926, shortly after Dzerzhinsky's death, Lubyanka Square was renamed Dzerzhinsky Square by the decision of the Presidium of the Moscow City Council.

In 1940, a competition was announced for the project of a monument to Dzerzhinsky, which was won by Sarra Lebedeva, who created a lifesized sculptural portrait of Dzerzhinsky, but her project was not implemented.

The monument was opened to the public on 20 December 1958, outside the Lubyanka Building, which housed the headquarters of the Soviet security services, in turn the OGPU, NKVD, NKGB, MGB and KGB.

August coup and Muzeon Park relocation 

On the evening of 22 August 1991, shortly after the failure of the coup attempt undertaken by the State Emergency Committee, thousands of people began to gather around the KGB building on Lubyanka Square, seeking to topple Dzerzhinsky's statue, seeing it as a symbol of the brutal Soviet past. People sprayed the words "executioner", “antichrist”, “Felix is finished” and the symbol of the Russian Orthodox Church on the pedestal.

By the evening of the same day, people climbed onto the statue and affixed ropes to it, attached to a truck. Toppling the monument in this way risked damaging the adjacent Lubyanka metro station. To avoid this, deputy chairman of the Moscow City Council , addressed the crowd and introduced a resolution with the Moscow City Council to remove the monument. It was then dismantled with a construction crane and taken to wasteland close to the new building of the Tretyakov Gallery. In 1992, the monument was moved to the Fallen Monument Park, where other Soviet-era monuments were collected.

See also 
 Monument to Felix Dzerzhinsky, Ufa

References 

Statues in Russia
Sculptures in the Soviet Union
Buildings and structures demolished in 1991
1991 disestablishments in the Soviet Union
Sculptures of men in Russia
Outdoor sculptures in Russia
Removed statues
Statues removed in 1991
Granite sculptures in Russia
Monuments and memorials in Moscow
Cultural heritage monuments of regional significance in Moscow